Rzezawa  is a village in Bochnia County, Lesser Poland Voivodeship, in southern Poland. It is the seat of the gmina (administrative district) called Gmina Rzezawa.

The village has a population of 2,500.

References

Rzezawa